Bartlett Creek is a river in Tuolumne County, California, United States.

Bartlett Creek heads at Bartlett Peak from which it takes its name.

See also
List of rivers of California

References

Rivers of Tuolumne County, California
Rivers of Northern California